Yuji or Yu Ji may refer to:

 Yuji Naka, is a Japanese video game programmer, designer and producer
 Yu Ji (painter), a Qing dynasty painter and calligrapher
 Yūji, a common masculine Japanese given name
 Consort Yu (Xiang Yu's wife) (虞姬; Yuji), the concubine of Xiang Yu, subject of the play Farewell My Concubine
 Gan Ji, a Taoist who lived in the late Han Dynasty. His name was believed to be misspelled as "Yu Ji".
 47077 Yuji, a main-belt asteroid

Towns
 Yuji, Wuqiao County (于集镇), in Wuqiao County, Hebei
 Yuji, Shangcheng County (余集镇), in Shangcheng County, Henan
 Yuji, Linghai (余积镇), in Linghai City, Liaoning
 Yuji, Liaocheng (于集镇), in Dongchangfu District, Liaocheng, Shandong

Townships
 Yuji Township, Funan County (于集乡), Anhui
 Yuji Township, Lingbi County (虞姬乡), in Lingbi County, Anhui
 Yuji Township, Ling County (于集乡), in Ling County, Shandong

Characters
 Yuji is the name of a character in Regular Show

See also
 Uji (disambiguation)